In 1847, Hermann Spiess, Ferdinand Ludwig Herff, and Gustav Schleicher founded die Darmstadt der Vierziger (the Society of Forty), sometimes referred to as the Socialistic Colony and Society.  The founders, as well as many of the members, were from Darmstadt, the capital of the Grand Duchy of Hesse. They originally planned to establish socialistic communes in Wisconsin.

Spiess and Herff were approached  in Wiesbaden by Adelsverein vice president and executive secretary-business director Count Carl Frederick Christian of Castell-Castell, who made a deal with them to colonize 200 families on the Fisher–Miller Land Grant territory in Texas.  In return, they were to receive $12,000 in money, livestock, and equipment and provisions for a year.  After the first year, the colonies were expected to support themselves. The colonies attempted were Castell, Leiningen, Bettina, Schoenburg, and Meerholz in Llano County; Darmstädler Farm in Comal County; and Tusculum in Kendall County. Of these, only two survived: Castell and Tusculum,  which was renamed Boerne in 1852. The colonies failed after the Adelsverein funding expired, and because of conflict of structure and authorities. Some members moved to other Adelsverein settlements in Texas; others moved elsewhere, or returned to Germany.

The Forty
The following list is derived from the first-hand account of Louis Reinhardt, as well as other historical records.

References

Source material

 

Germany history-related lists
Mun
Lists of people from Texas
Comal County, Texas
Kendall County, Texas
Llano County, Texas
German-American culture in Texas
German American